Magnesium (12Mg) naturally occurs in three stable isotopes: , , and . The lighter isotopes mostly decay to isotopes of sodium while the heavier isotopes decay to isotopes of aluminium.

List of isotopes 

|-
| 
| style="text-align:right" | 12
| style="text-align:right" | 6
| 
| 
| 2p
| 
| 0+
|
|
|-
| 
| style="text-align:right" | 12
| style="text-align:right" | 7
| 
| 
| 2p
| 
| 1/2−#
|
|
|-
| rowspan=2|  
| rowspan=2 style="text-align:right" | 12
| rowspan=2 style="text-align:right" | 8
| rowspan=2|
| rowspan=2|
| β+
| 
| rowspan=2|0+
| rowspan=2|
| rowspan=2|
|-
| β+p
| 
|-
| rowspan=4|  
| rowspan=4 style="text-align:right" | 12
| rowspan=4 style="text-align:right" | 9
| rowspan=4|
| rowspan=4|
| β+
| 
| rowspan=4|5/2+
| rowspan=4|
| rowspan=4|
|-
| β+p
| 
|- 
| β+α
| 
|-
| β+pα
| 
|-
|   
| style="text-align:right" | 12
| style="text-align:right" | 10
| 
| 
| β+
| 
| 0+
|
|
|-
|   
| style="text-align:right" | 12
| style="text-align:right" | 11
| 
| 
| β+
| 
| 3/2+
|
|
|-
|   
| style="text-align:right" | 12
| style="text-align:right" | 12
| 
| colspan=3 align=center|Stable
| 0+
| colspan=2 align=center|[, ]
|-
|   
| style="text-align:right" | 12
| style="text-align:right" | 13
| 
| colspan=3 align=center|Stable
| 5/2+
| colspan=2 align=center|[, ]
|-
|   
| style="text-align:right" | 12
| style="text-align:right" | 14
| 
| colspan=3 align=center|Stable
| 0+
| colspan=2 align=center|[, ]
|-
|   
| style="text-align:right" | 12
| style="text-align:right" | 15
| 
| 
| β−
| 
| 1/2+
|
|
|-
|   
| style="text-align:right" | 12
| style="text-align:right" | 16
| 
| 
| β−
| 
| 0+
|
|
|-
|   
| style="text-align:right" | 12
| style="text-align:right" | 17
| 
| 
| β−
| 
| 3/2+
|
|
|-
| rowspan=2|  
| rowspan=2 style="text-align:right" | 12
| rowspan=2 style="text-align:right" | 18
| rowspan=2|
| rowspan=2|
| β− (> )
| 
| rowspan=2|0+
| rowspan=2|
| rowspan=2|
|-
| β−n (< )
| 
|-
| rowspan=2|  
| rowspan=2 style="text-align:right" | 12
| rowspan=2 style="text-align:right" | 19
| rowspan=2|
| rowspan=2|
| β−
| 
| rowspan=2|1/2+
| rowspan=2|
| rowspan=2|
|-
| β−n
| 
|-
| rowspan=2|  
| rowspan=2 style="text-align:right" | 12
| rowspan=2 style="text-align:right" | 20
| rowspan=2|
| rowspan=2|
| β−
| 
| rowspan=2|0+
| rowspan=2|
| rowspan=2|
|-
| β−n
| 
|-
| rowspan=3|  
| rowspan=3 style="text-align:right" | 12
| rowspan=3 style="text-align:right" | 21
| rowspan=3|
| rowspan=3|
| β−
| 
| rowspan=3|3/2−
| rowspan=3|
| rowspan=3|
|-
| β−n
| 
|-
| β−2n ?
|  ?
|-
| rowspan=3|  
| rowspan=3 style="text-align:right" | 12
| rowspan=3 style="text-align:right" | 22
| rowspan=3|
| rowspan=3|
| β− (> )
| 
| rowspan=3|0+
| rowspan=3|
| rowspan=3|
|-
| β−n
| 
|-
| β−2n (< )
| 
|-
| rowspan=3|  
| rowspan=3 style="text-align:right" | 12
| rowspan=3 style="text-align:right" | 23
| rowspan=3|
| rowspan=3|
| β−n
| 
| rowspan=3|(3/2−, 5/2−)
| rowspan=3|
| rowspan=3|
|-
| β−
| 
|-
| β−2n ?
|  ?
|-
| rowspan=3|  
| rowspan=3 style="text-align:right" | 12
| rowspan=3 style="text-align:right" | 24
| rowspan=3|
| rowspan=3|
| β−
| 
| rowspan=3|0+
| rowspan=3|
| rowspan=3|
|-
| β−n
| 
|-
| β−2n ?
|  ?
|-
| rowspan=3|  
| rowspan=3 style="text-align:right" | 12
| rowspan=3 style="text-align:right" | 25
| rowspan=3|
| rowspan=3|
| β− ?
|  ?
| rowspan=3|(3/2−)
| rowspan=3|
| rowspan=3|
|-
| β−n ?
|  ?
|-
| β−2n ?
|  ?
|-
| rowspan=3|  
| rowspan=3 style="text-align:right" | 12
| rowspan=3 style="text-align:right" | 26
| rowspan=3|#
| rowspan=3|3.1(4 (stat), 2 (sys)) ms
| β−n (81%)
| 
| rowspan=3|0+
| rowspan=3|
| rowspan=3|
|-
| β− (9%)
| 
|-
| β−2n (9%)
| 
|-
| rowspan=3|  
| rowspan=3 style="text-align:right" | 12
| rowspan=3 style="text-align:right" | 28
| rowspan=3|#
| rowspan=3|1# ms [> ]
| β− ?
|  ?
| rowspan=3|0+
| rowspan=3|
| rowspan=3|
|-
| β−n ?
|  ?
|-
| β−2n ?
|  ?
|-

External links
Magnesium isotopes data from The Berkeley Laboratory Isotopes Project's

References

 
Magnesium
Magnesium